Egor Matvievici (born 28 April 1995) is a Moldovan tennis player.

Matvievici has a career high ATP doubles ranking of 1,400 achieved on 9 December 2019.

Matvievici represents Moldova at the Davis Cup, where he has a W/L record of 3–3.

In January 2020, he participated at the ATP Cup as a member of the Moldovan team.

Davis Cup

Participations: (3–3)

   indicates the outcome of the Davis Cup match followed by the score, date, place of event, the zonal classification and its phase, and the court surface.

References

External links

1997 births
Living people
Moldovan male tennis players
Sportspeople from Chișinău
21st-century Moldovan people